Declaratory Rescript of the Illyrian Nation was issued on 16 July 1779 by Maria Theresa, Dowager-Empress and Queen of Hungary (1740-1780). It was a royal rescript, issued in response to a series of petitions made by Eastern Orthodox subjects of the Habsburg monarchy, regarding the regulation of their religious freedom and ecclesiastical autonomy. The document was the result of a process, initiated by previously issued Regulamentum privilegiorum (1770) and Regulamentum Illyricae Nationis (1777), both of them replaced by the royal rescript of 1779.

The Rescript

The Rescript contained detailed regulations on the organization of the Metropolitanate of Karlovci, an autonomous ecclesiastical province of Eastern Orthodox Christians in the Habsburg monarchy, who were mainly Serbs and Romanians. Since the end of the 17th century, the archaic term Illyrians was used by the state administration in a classicizing manner, at first as a designation for Serbs, and later for all Eastern Orthodox subjects, including Serbs, Romanians and some other minor groups. 

During the reign of Maria Theresa (1740-1780), several assemblies of Habsburg Serbs were held, with royal consent, sending their grievances and petitions to the Habsburg court. In response to that, the Rescript of 1779 regulated, on some issues restrictively, many important questions, from the procedures regarding the elections of Eastern Orthodox bishops, to the management of dioceses, parishes and monasteries. With small changes, the Rescript was upheld in force until it was replaced by the "Royal Rescript" issued on 10 August 1868.

See also
 Great Migrations of the Serbs
 Arsenije III Crnojević
 Arsenije IV Jovanović
 Metropolitanate of Karlovci

References

Sources

 
 
 
 
 
 
 

1779 documents
1779 in law
1779 in religion
Habsburg Serbs
History of the Serbian Orthodox Church
Vojvodina under Habsburg rule
18th century in Serbia
Habsburg Transylvania
History of the Romanians